At the 1972 Winter Olympics, ten Nordic skiing events were contested – seven cross-country skiing events, two ski jumping events, and one Nordic combined event.

1972 Winter Olympics events
1972